Herochroma supraviridaria is a species of moth of the family Geometridae first described by Hiroshi Inoue in 1999. It is found in the Chinese provinces of Fujian and  Guangxi and in Taiwan.

References

External links
A study on the genus Herochroma Swinhoe in China, with descriptions of four new species (Lepidoptera: Geometridae: Geometrinae). Acta Entomologica Sinica

Moths described in 1999
Pseudoterpnini
Moths of Asia
Moths of Taiwan